The Poverty Plainsmen is a Saskatchewan-based country music band, originating in smalltown Tilston, Manitoba by brothers Sean Smith and Mark Smith in October 1987.

Career
They have had a number one single on the country charts for their performance of "Sister Golden Hair," which is a remake of a pop hit from the 70s by the group America. It was in the top 10 for eight weeks, and became the number one song for two weeks in Canada.   

Since 1994 with the release of their album Gotta Be a Believer, they have done two more albums: There's No Looking Back (1999) and Lap of Luxury (2005).

On April 24, 2004, band member Sean Smith received a severe spinal cord injury. He is still currently in rehabilitation.

Awards
SCMA Group of the Year (1997, 1998, 2006)
PMW Outstanding Country Recording (2000)
CCMA Independent Vocal Group or Duo of the Year (2001)
SCMA Video of the Year - "Same Things" (2001)
CMW Independent Country Album (2001)
SCMA Group or Duo of the Year (2002, 2003, 2005)
SCMA Entertainers of the Year (2002)
SCMA Single of the Year - "Time Will Tell" (2002)
SCMA Achievement Award (2004)
SCMA Single of the Year - "Everybody Say Eh!" (2005)
SCMA Backup Band of the Year (2006)

Discography

Albums

Singles

References

External links
 Awards

Canadian country music groups
Musical groups from Saskatchewan
Musical groups established in 1987
Musical groups from Manitoba
1987 establishments in Manitoba